Salvatore Papa (born 26 November 1990) is an Italian footballer who plays as a midfielder for  club Gelbison.

Club career
Born in Cosenza, Calabria, Papa made his league debut for Serie C2 team Rende on 14 January 2007 as substitute. At the end of the season the team relegated, re-located to Cosenza and merged with AS Cosenza Calcio and became Fortitudo Cosenza. In June 2007 he was loaned to Internazionale's Primavera youth team along with Francesco D'Angelo. In July 2008, Inter decided to buy him outright and loaned him to Triestina. He spent 2009–10 season at Chievo for free.

In July 2010 he left for Prima Divisione club Foligno along with Jacopo Fiorucci from Chievo reserve. The club signed Ivan Merli Sala and Papa in co-ownership deal from Chievo for a peppercorn of €100 each. He was the regular of the team. In June 2012 Chievo bought back Papa but he was transferred to Santarcangelo.

On 2 July 2021 he signed with Ancona-Matelica.

On 20 September 2022, Papa moved to Gelbison.

References

External links
 Football.it Profile 
 

1990 births
Living people
Sportspeople from Cosenza
Footballers from Calabria
Italian footballers
Association football midfielders
Serie C players
Serie D players
Rende Calcio 1968 players
A.S.D. Città di Foligno 1928 players
Santarcangelo Calcio players
S.F. Aversa Normanna players
Vigor Lamezia players
A.C. Cuneo 1905 players
Ravenna F.C. players
Ancona-Matelica players